is a Japanese actress. In 1965, she signed a contract with Toho. Following year, she made her film debut in Taifu to Zakuro. She portrayed Anne Yuri in the Japanese television series Ultra Seven (1967–1968) and subsequent appearances in other Ultra Series film and television and projects.

Filmography

Film
1966: Taifu to Zakuro as Yasuko Nagase
1967: Gō! Gō! Wakadaishō
1969: Koi ni mezameru koro as Keiko
1970: Bravo! Wakadaishō
1972: Godzilla vs. Gigan as Tomoko Tomoe
1973: Kôkôsei burai hikae: Tsuki no Muramasa as Yôko Kochiya
1973: Kôkôsei burai hikae: Kanjirû Muramasa
1973: Sân ike kangôku: kyo akû han
1973: Poruno jidaigeki: Bôhachi bushidô as Omon
1974: Bohachi Bushido: Code of the Forgotten Eight
1974: Imôto as Student
1974: Mesu as Sato
1975: Kôshoku: Genroku (maruhi) monogatari as Onatsu
1975: New Battles Without Honor and Humanity: The Boss's Head
1979: Ôgon no inu as Misa
1997: Ultraman Zearth 2 as Anne Yuri
2006: Ultraman Mebius & Ultraman Brothers as Anne Yuri
2007: Shin onna tachiguishi retsuden
2008: Superior Ultraman 8 Brothers as Anne Yuri
2008: The Sky Crawlers as Yuri
2008: Daikessen! Chô urutora 8 kyôdai as Anne
2013: Intâmisshon
2016: Kôtei ni kochi fuite

TV
1967: Ultra Seven as Anne Yuri
1972: Mirrorman as Yuko Naruse
1973-74: playgirl 
1974: Ultraman Leo as Anne Yuri
1984: Hissatsu Shikirinin as Okatsu
1994: Heisei Ultra Seven as Anne Yuri
2007: Ultraseven X as Anne Yuri

References

External links

Japanese voice actresses
1947 births
Living people
People from Tokyo